Maxime Gérard Biamou Ngapmou Yoke (born 13 November 1990) is a French professional footballer who plays as a striker.

Career
Born in Créteil, Biamou grew up in Bonneuil-sur-Marne and later trained at the CFFP in Paris. His early career was impacted by adductor injuries, and he played no football for three years while studying at university. He later played football locally in Bonneuil-sur-Marne before spending his early career in French non-league football with Villemomble Sports and Yzeure, later moving to England and joining Sutton United. He signed for Coventry City in June 2017. In August 2018 he suffered an anterior cruciate ligament injury, and was ruled out for a number of months. At the start of the 2019–20 season Coventry tried to play Biamou on the left wing; manager Mark Robins judged it unsuccessful and said he wouldn't be repeating it.  In a post-match interview conducted after a 2–0 win against Southend United in February 2020, Biamou praised the club for his footballing development, saying "I am a completely different player since I came to Coventry".

On 12 May 2021 it was announced that he would leave Coventry at the end of the season, following the expiry of his contract.

In October 2021 he signed a short-term contract with Scottish club Dundee United.

Personal life
Born in France, Biamou is of Cameroonian descent.

Career statistics

Honours
Coventry City
EFL League Two Play-Off Final: 2017-18

EFL League One: 2019–20

References

1990 births
Sportspeople from Créteil
Living people
French footballers
French sportspeople of Cameroonian descent
Association football forwards
Villemomble Sports players
Moulins Yzeure Foot players
Sutton United F.C. players
Coventry City F.C. players
Dundee United F.C. players
Championnat National 2 players
Championnat National 3 players
National League (English football) players
English Football League players
French expatriate footballers
Expatriate footballers in England
French expatriate sportspeople in England
Expatriate footballers in Scotland
French expatriate sportspeople in Scotland
Scottish Professional Football League players
Footballers from Val-de-Marne